Events from the year 2002 in Russia.

Incumbents
 President: Vladimir Putin
 Prime Minister: Mikhail Kasyanov

Events
 21 January – Commercial television station TV6 closed down by the Russian government.
 8 February–24 February – Russia competes at the Winter Olympics in Salt Lake City, United States, and wins 5 gold, 4 silver and 4 bronze medals.
 4 March – Good Night, Little Ones! airs its first episode on its current home, Telekanal Rossiya, still airing on the VGTRK today. 
 12 May – An accident at the Baikonur Cosmodrome kills eight people and destroys a Buran spacecraft.
 1 July – Bashkirian Airlines Flight 2937 from Moscow to Barcelona in Spain collides with DHL Flight 611 over Überlingen, Germany with 71 fatalities, mostly Russians.
 25 September – Vitim event: a large meteorite crashes in the Vitim River basin in Siberia.
 23 October – Moscow theater hostage crisis: 40 Chechen separatists seize a theatre in Moscow taking 850 hostages.
 26 October – Moscow theater hostage crisis: Russian special forces storm the theatre killing the Chechens and over 100 hostages.
 1 December – Turbomilk, a graphic design company is founded in Samara.

Notable births
 16 April – Dayana Kirillova, singer

Notable deaths

 8 January – Aleksandr Mikhailovich Prokhorov, physicist, Nobel Prize laureate (born 1916)
 19 September – Sergei Bodrov Jr., actor (born 1971)

See also
List of Russian films of 2002

References

External links

 
Years of the 21st century in Russia
2000s in Russia
Russia
Russia
Russia